

Thermal expansion

Notes 
All values refer to 25 °C unless noted.

References

CRC
As quoted from this source in an online version of: David R. Lide (ed), CRC Handbook of Chemistry and Physics, 84th Edition. CRC Press. Boca Raton, Florida, 2003; Section 12, Properties of Solids; Thermal and Physical Properties of Pure Metals
 Touloukian, Y. S., Thermophysical Properties of Matter, Vol. 12, Thermal Expansion, IFI/Plenum, New York, 1975.

CR2
As quoted in an online version of:
 David R. Lide (ed), CRC Handbook of Chemistry and Physics, 84th Edition. CRC Press. Boca Raton, Florida, 2003; Section 4, Properties of the Elements and Inorganic Compounds; Physical Properties of the Rare Earth Metals
which further refers to:
 Beaudry, B. J. and Gschneidner, K.A., Jr., in Handbook on the Physics and Chemistry of Rare Earths, Vol. 1, Gschneidner, K.A., Jr. and Eyring, L., Eds., North-Holland Physics, Amsterdam, 1978, 173.
 McEwen, K.A., in Handbook on the Physics and Chemistry of Rare Earths, Vol. 1, Gschneidner, K.A., Jr. and Eyring, L., Eds., North-Holland Physics, Amsterdam, 1978, 411.

LNG
As quoted from this source in an online version of: J.A. Dean (ed), Lange's Handbook of Chemistry (15th Edition), McGraw-Hill, 1999; Section 4; Table 4.1, Electronic Configuration and Properties of the Elements
 Touloukian, Y. S., Thermophysical Properties of Matter, Vol. 12, Thermal Expansion, Plenum, New York, 1975.

WEL
As quoted at http://www.webelements.com/ from these sources:
 D.R. Lide, (Ed.) in Chemical Rubber Company handbook of chemistry and physics, CRC Press, Boca Raton, Florida, USA, 79th edition, 1998.
 A.M. James and M.P. Lord in Macmillan's Chemical and Physical Data, Macmillan, London, UK, 1992.
 G.W.C. Kaye and T. H. Laby in Tables of physical and chemical constants, Longman, London, UK, 15th edition, 1993.
 J.A. Dean (ed) in Lange's Handbook of Chemistry, McGraw-Hill, New York, USA, 14th edition, 1992.

Properties of chemical elements
Chemical element data pages